James Frederic McCurdy (1847–1935), born in Chatham, New Brunswick, was Professor of Oriental Languages, University College, Toronto, Canada. He studied at the University of New Brunswick, then at the University of Göttingen and University of Leipzig, then Princeton Theological Seminary under William Henry Green. His main area of study was the origins of ancient Hebrew and linguistic archeology. He was one of the scholars who held to the view that the ancient Israelites already had an advanced literary culture at the time of the migration from Canaan to Egypt.

Works
 Aryo-Semitic speech: a study in linguistic archaeology 1881
 History, Prophecy and the Monuments of Israel and the Nations 1914
Articles
 contributions to the Jewish Encyclopedia 1912.
 Celebration of the fiftieth anniversary of the appointment of Professor William Henry Green as an instructor in Princeton Theological Seminary: Essay Dr Green's contribution to semitic scholarship

References

1847 births
1935 deaths
Canadian biblical scholars
Canadian Hebraists
University of New Brunswick alumni
University of Göttingen alumni
Leipzig University alumni
Princeton Theological Seminary alumni
Contributors to the Jewish Encyclopedia
People from Miramichi, New Brunswick